Yes I Do may refer to:

Music
Yes I Do (Anne Murray album)

Songs
"Yes I Do" (song), a 2020 song by L.A.B.
"Yes I Do", song by Rascal Flatts from Me and My Gang
"Yes I Do", song by The Psychedelic Furs from Forever Now (The Psychedelic Furs album)
"Yes I Do", song by Terri Walker from L.O.V.E (album)
"Yes I Do", song by Pentagram from First Daze Here Too, covered by Witchcraft single 2012 
"Yes I Do", song by Marvin Phillips (singer), Lottie, Ling	1956
"Yes I Do", song by James Wayne (R&B musician),	Wayne, Scott 1957
"Yes I Do", song by Dorian (Scottish band),	Vernon Dicks 1959
"Yes I Do", single by Solomon Burke,	Russell 1964
"Yes I Do", song by Ram John Holder, Ram John Holder	1968
"Yes I Do", single by Harpo (singer),	Jan "Harpo" Svensson	1981
"Yes I Do", song by Penny DeHaven, Mary Fielder, Robert Thames	1984
"Yes I Do", single by Shakin' Stevens, G. Sulsh, S. Leathwood, B. Guard	1990
"Yes I Do", song by Toshinori Yonekura, 1997
"Yes I Do", song by The Attic (band),	G. Rainford, J. James, R. Rycroft 

"Yes I Do", song by Monika Christodoulou, 2010